Fort San Jose is a former Spanish fortification on the island of Guam, now a United States territory.  It is located north of the village of Umatac, on a hill over looking both Fouha Bay and Umatac Bay, the place were Spanish galleons traveling between Manila in the Spanish Philippines and Acapulco, Mexico stopped for water and supplies.

History
The fort was built about 1802 under the administration of Vicente Blanco, Governor of the Marianas. 
The route which the fort protected fell out of use in 1815 with Mexican independence, and it has been ruins since the 1850s. 

The fort site was listed on the National Register of Historic Places in 1974.

Architecture

See also
National Register of Historic Places listings in Guam

References

Buildings and structures on the National Register of Historic Places in Guam
Buildings and structures completed in 1802
Forts on the National Register of Historic Places
19th century in Guam
Fortifications of the Spanish East Indies
1802 establishments in the Spanish Empire
Umatac, Guam